This is a list of awards and nominations for Fargo, an American black comedy–crime drama anthology television series that debuted on FX on April 15, 2014. Season 1 stars Billy Bob Thornton, Allison Tolman, Colin Hanks and Martin Freeman. Season 2 stars Kirsten Dunst, Patrick Wilson, Jesse Plemons, Jean Smart and Ted Danson. Season 3 stars Ewan McGregor, Carrie Coon, Mary Elizabeth Winstead, Goran Bogdan, and David Thewlis. Season 4 stars Chris Rock, Jessie Buckley, Jason Schwartzman, Ben Whishaw, and Jack Huston.

The series has been nominated for a total of 228 awards, having won fifty-one of those nominations.

ADG Awards 
The ADG Excellence in Production Design Awards (ADG Awards), is an annual award presented by the Art Directors Guild to recognize excellence in production design and art direction in the film and television industries. Honorees are presented with an award made by New York firm, Society Awards.

American Film Institute Awards 
Established in 2000, the American Film Institute Awards (AFI) is presented by American Film Institute and honors the best ten outstanding films and television programs of each year.

Artios Awards 
Since October 1985, the Casting Society of America has presented the Artios Awards for excellence in casting.

ASCAP Film and Television Music Awards 
The American Society of Composers, Authors and Publishers Awards honors its top members in a series of annual awards shows in seven different music categories: pop, rhythm and soul, film and television, Latin, country, Christian, and concert music.

Banff Rockie Awards 
The Banff World Media Festival (formerly known as the Banff World Television Festival) is an international media event held in the Canadian Rockies at the Fairmont Banff Springs Hotel in Banff, Alberta, Canada. The festival is dedicated to world television and digital content and its creation and development.

Black Reel Awards 
The Black Reel Awards began in 2000 and were designed to annually recognize and celebrate the achievements of black people in feature, independent and television films. Awards range from the art of character portrayals to the artistry displayed behind the camera.

British Society of Cinematographers Awards

Canadian Society of Cinematographers Awards

Camerimage 
The International Film Festival of the Art of Cinematography Camerimage is a festival exclusively dedicated to the celebration of cinematography and recognition of its creators, cinematographers.

Cinema Audio Society Awards 
The Cinema Audio Society Awards, commonly abbreviated as a CAS Awards, was created in 1964 and honors outstanding achievement in sound mixing.

Crime Thriller Awards 
The Crime Thriller Awards is a British awards ceremony dedicated to crime thriller fiction.

Critics' Choice Television Awards 
Established in 2011, the Critics' Choice Television Awards is an annual award presented by the Broadcast Television Journalists Association (BTJA).

Dorian Awards 
The Dorian Awards is an annual endeavor organized by the Gay and Lesbian Entertainment Critics Association (GALECA).

Eddie Awards 
Founded in 1950, the American Cinema Editors (ACE) is an honorary society of film editors that are voted in based on the qualities of professional achievements, their education of others, and their dedication to editing.

Emmy Awards 
Created in 1949, the Emmy Awards, or simply Emmy, recognizes excellence in the television industry, and corresponds to the Academy Award (for film), the Grammy Award (for music), and the Tony Award (for theatre). Because the Emmy Awards are given in various sectors of the American television industry, they are presented in different annual ceremonies held throughout the year. The Primetime Emmy Awards recognizes outstanding work in American primetime entertainment programming, while Creative Arts Emmy Awards are presented in recognition of technical and other similar achievements, commonly awarded to behind-the-scenes personnel such as art directors, costume designers, cinematographers, casting directors, and sound editors.

Primetime Emmy Awards

Creative Arts Emmy Award

Empire Awards 
The Empire Awards, is an annual British awards ceremony honoring cinematic achievements in the local and global film industry. Winners are awarded the Empire Award statuette. The awards, first presented in 1996, are presented by the British film magazine Empire with the winners voted by the readers of the magazine.

Golden Globe Awards 
The Golden Globe Award is an American award by 93 members of the Hollywood Foreign Press Association (HFPA) recognizing excellence in film and television, both domestic and foreign.

Golden Reel Awards 
Founded in 1953, the Motion Picture Sound Editors (MPSE) is an honorary society of motion picture sound editors. Since 1989, they present the Golden Reel Awards, in which honors the best work in the various areas of sound editing.

Hollywood Music in Media Awards 
The Hollywood Music in Media Awards recognizes and honors the music of visual mediums (film, TV, movie trailers, video games, commercials, etc.), the talented individuals responsible for creating, producing and placing it and the music of artists, both mainstream and independent, from around the globe.

IFMCA Awards 
The annual International Film Music Critics Association Awards are the only awards given to composers by active film music journalists, and which are seen by many as a valuable precursor to the Academy Awards in the absence of a guild for composers.

Joey Awards 
The Joey Awards goal is to reward young actors and actresses in Canada for their hard work and dedication to their craft.

Location Managers Guild International Awards 
The Location Managers Guild International is an organization of experienced career professionals in the motion picture, television, commercial and print production industries.

Make-Up Artists and Hair Stylists Guild Awards 
The Make-Up Artists and Hair Stylists Guild is an American labor union representing make-up artists and hair stylist in feature films, television programs, commercials, live network events and theatrical productions in the United States.

Online Film and TV Association Awards 
Online Film & Television Association Awards or The OFTA Awards, is an annual awards ceremony in which Outstanding Achievement in film and television is honoured. The presentation of these awards began in 1996.

Peabody Awards 
When the first set of Peabody Awards were given out in 1941, broadcasting meant radio. Before the decade was over, the scope of the award grew to include television storytelling. By the late 20th Century, television was redefined through cable and satellite technologies. The Peabody Awards again recognized shifts in storytelling as a result of these changes.

Producers Guild of America Awards 
The Producers Guild of America Awards was established in 1990 by the Producers Guild of America, in order to honor the visionaries who produce and execute motion picture and television product.

Royal Television Society Programme Awards 
The Royal Television Society, or RTS, is a British-based educational charity for the discussion, and analysis of television in all its forms, past, present and future. It is the oldest television society in the world.

Satellite Awards 
The Satellite Awards are annual awards given by the International Press Academy (IPA) that are commonly noted in entertainment industry journals and blogs.

Saturn Awards 
The Saturn Award is an award presented annually by the Academy of Science Fiction, Fantasy and Horror Films to honor the top works mainly in science fiction, fantasy, and horror in film, television, and home video.

Screen Actors Guild Awards 
The Screen Actors Guild Awards, also known as the SAG Award, is an accolade given by the Screen Actors Guild‐American Federation of Television and Radio Artists (SAG-AFTRA) to recognize outstanding performances in film and primetime television.

Screenwriters Choice Awards 
The Screenwriters Choice Awards honors writers in four categories: Best Original Screenplay, Best Adapted Screenplay, Best Television Comedy, and Best Television Drama.

Television Critics Association Awards 
The TCA Awards is presented by the Television Critics Association in recognition of excellence in television.

Women's Image Network Awards 
Women's Image Network produces The Women's Image Network Awards to celebrate male and female media artists whose work advances the value of women and girls.

Writers Guild of America Awards 
The Writers Guild of America Awards is presented annually by the Writers Guild of America, East and Writers Guild of America, West since 1949.

References 

Awards
Fargo